The French School in Ljubljana (EFL) is a school in Slovenia that caters to students from over 15 nationalities, ranging from 3 to 15 years of age. It was established in 1991.

Location
The French School in Ljubljana is located in Ljubljana's Trnovo District in the premises of Livada Primary School. It is in a mixed-used area containing residential housing and some small businesses. Mali Graben, a branch of the Gradaščica River, flows past the neighborhood to the northwest, and the Ljubljanica River lies to the east.

References

External links

French School in Ljubljana website
French School in Ljubljana at Geopedia

International schools in Slovenia
Schools in Ljubljana
Primary schools in Slovenia
Educational institutions established in 1991
Ljubljana
1991 establishments in Slovenia